Alexander Morrison (3 February 1829 – 31 May 1903) was Headmaster of Scotch College, Melbourne, Australia, for 47 years.

Early life
Morrison was born in Morayshire, Scotland, the sixth son of Donald Morrison, a farmer, and his wife Catherine née Fraser. Alexander was educated at the Elgin Academy and King's College, University of Aberdeen, (M.A. 1851). He was a master for two years at a school at Elgin, and then for three years was in charge of St John's Grammar School, Hamilton. During this period the number of boys at the school increased from 194 to 397. Morrison married Christina (died 1883), daughter of Alexander Fraser, in 1855. In 1856 he accepted the position of headmaster of the Scotch College, Melbourne, after inaugural headmaster Robert Lawson had resigned. Morrison travelled in the Essex with his wife, a son and younger brother Robert (who later became vice-principal at Scotch College 1869–1904). They arrived in Melbourne on 25 July 1857, and a week later began his duties.

Career in Australia
When Morrison came to Melbourne there were only 50-day boys and six boarders at Scotch College, but in a few years, it became one of the leading public schools in Australia, with a high reputation for scholarship. By 1870 enrollments had passed 300. In 1873 considerable additions were made to the school buildings, including a house for the principal, but following a severe illness in 1874 Morrison was given a year's leave of absence and traveled widely in Europe. He was appointed a member of the council of the University of Melbourne in 1878, and for the remainder of his life was one of the most regular attendants at its meetings.

In November 1876 Morrison moved the motion at the General Assembly of the Presbyterian Church of Victoria which led to the founding of Ormond College at the University of Melbourne, and he largely influenced Francis Ormond in his endowing of the college. He worked hard himself in obtaining subscriptions when the college was instituted, was elected chairman of the trustees, and presided at the opening ceremony on 18 March 1881. In his earlier years at Scotch College, Morrison took classes in several subjects, but as the school increased in numbers his work became largely confined to administration.

The University of Aberdeen conferred on Morrison the honorary degree of Doctor of Laws in 1876. He was the author of A First Latin Course.

Legacy
Morrison was tall, stern-looking and had a black beard. He was a strict but just disciplinarian who, though he mellowed as he grew older, did not quite gain the affection of his boys in the same way as Lawrence Arthur Adamson, William Still Littlejohn and Albert Bythesea Weigall. He set a high standard of scholarship in the school and never lost his grip of the conduct of it. He trained and encouraged Frank Shew (1851-1934), who joined the staff in 1870 and for 53 years was beloved by succeeding generations of boys (see W. J. Turner's eulogy in Blow for Balloons, chapter XXVI.). Other distinguished masters were Weigall, Alexander Sutherland, and W. F. Ingram. This was perhaps the most important factor in Morrison's 47 successful years in charge of Scotch College, but his personality was felt in other ways in the school. His wide general interests enabled him to be an important figure in all matters relating to education in Victoria, whether at the council table of the university, or when preparing and giving evidence for a Royal Commission.

Morrison died suddenly from heart failure on 31 May 1903, survived by four sons and three daughters.

References
E. L. French, 'Morrison, Alexander (1829 - 1903)', Australian Dictionary of Biography, Volume 5, MUP, 1974, pp 295–297. Retrieved 2009-10-18

1829 births
1903 deaths
Scottish emigrants to colonial Australia
Australian Presbyterians
Alumni of the University of Aberdeen
Australian headmasters
19th-century Australian educators
Scotch College, Melbourne
People educated at Elgin Academy, Moray
Alumni of King's College, Cambridge
People from Moray